AS Poum is a New Caledonian football team playing at the second level New Caledonia Second Level. It is based in Poum.

Achievements
New Caledonia Division Honneur: 1
 1998

References
 

Football clubs in New Caledonia